Fore Point is a historic private summer lakefront estate on the shore of Squam Lake in Sandwich, New Hampshire.  The  property includes a main house, guest house, bunkhouse, and boathouse, designed and built by Julius Smith, a local builder, in 1953.  They camp was built for Victoria Tytus, widow of a member of the locally prominent Coolidge family, who own other summer properties in the vicinity.  Despite its Mid-Century Modern styling, it bears a strong organizational resemblance to much older camps on Squam Lake.

The property was listed on the National Register of Historic Places in 2017.

See also
National Register of Historic Places listings in Carroll County, New Hampshire

References

Houses on the National Register of Historic Places in New Hampshire
Houses completed in 1953
Houses in Carroll County, New Hampshire
National Register of Historic Places in Carroll County, New Hampshire
Sandwich, New Hampshire